Joanna Rogers Macy (born May 2, 1929) is an environmental activist, author, and scholar of Buddhism, general systems theory, and deep ecology. She is the author of twelve books.

She was married to the late Francis Underhill Macy, the activist and Russian scholar who founded the Center for Safe Energy.

Biography

Early life and education
Macy credits poet and activist Muriel Rukeyser with starting her on the path to becoming a poet and writer herself. When she was a high school student in New York City, she cut school and took the train from Long Island to Manhattan in order to attend a poetry reading by Rukeyser; the hall was already full to capacity when Joanna arrived, but Rukeyser invited her to come onto the stage and sit at her feet during the reading.

Macy graduated from Wellesley College in 1950 and received her Ph.D in Religious Studies in 1978 from Syracuse University, Syracuse. Her doctoral work, under the mentorship of Ervin László, focused on convergences between causation in systems thinking and the Buddhist central doctrine of mutual causality or interdependent co-arising.

Career
Macy is an international spokesperson for anti-nuclear causes, peace, justice, and environmentalism, most renowned for her book Coming Back to Life: Practices to Reconnect Our Lives, Our World and the Great Turning initiative, which deals with the transformation from, as she terms it, an industrial growth society to what she considers to be a more sustainable civilization. She has created a theoretical framework for personal and social change, and a workshop methodology for its application. Her work addresses psychological and spiritual issues, Buddhist thought, and contemporary science.

Key influences
Macy first encountered Buddhism in 1965 while working with Tibetan refugees in northern India, particularly the Ven. 8th Khamtrul Rinpoche, Sister Karma Khechog Palmo, Ven. Dugu Choegyal Rinpoche, and Tokden Antrim of the Tashi Jong community.  Her spiritual practice is drawn from the Theravada tradition of Nyanaponika Thera and Rev. Sivali of Sri Lanka, Munindraji of West Bengal, and Dhiravamsa of Thailand.

Key formative influences to her teaching in the field of the connection to living systems theory have been Ervin Laszlo who introduced her to systems theory through his writings (especially Introduction to Systems Philosophy and Systems, Structure and Experience), and who worked with her as advisor on her doctoral dissertation (later adapted as Mutual Causality) and on a project for the Club of Rome. Gregory Bateson, through his Steps to an Ecology of Mind and in a summer seminar, also shaped her thought, as did the writings of Ludwig von Bertalanffy, Arthur Koestler, and Hazel Henderson.  She was influenced in the studies of biological systems by Tyrone Cashman, and economic systems by Kenneth Boulding. Donella Meadows provided insights on the planetary consequences of runaway systems, and Elisabet Sahtouris provided further information about self-organizing systems in evolutionary perspective.

Work
Macy travels giving lectures, workshops, and trainings internationally. Her work, originally called "Despair and Empowerment Work" was acknowledged as being part of the deep ecology tradition after she encountered the work of Arne Naess and John Seed, but as a result of disillusion with academic disputes in the field, she now calls it "the Work that Reconnects". Widowed by the death of her husband, Francis Underhill Macy, in January 2009, she lives in Berkeley, California, near her children and grandchildren. She served as adjunct professor to three graduate schools in the San Francisco Bay Area: the Starr King School for the Ministry, the University of Creation Spirituality, and California Institute of Integral Studies. where she is still on the faculty.

Writings

See also
 David Korten, a collaborator with Macy on the Great Turning Initiative

References

External links

 Joanna Macy's website on the work of Experiential Deep Ecology
 Gaia Foundation of Western Australia — an Australian organisation based on the principles of Deep Ecology.
 California Institute of Integral Studies
 Interview with Joanna Macy by John Malkin — published in ascent magazine, summer 2008
 The Healing on Mother Earth Project — a Sebastopol, California organisation based on the principles of deep ecology.
 A Wild Love for the World, an interview with Joanna Macy, by Krista Tippet on the American Radio Show "On Being." This page provides links to the original program that first aired in 2010, along with the unedited version of the program. Macy also recites many Rilke poems during the show, but some of these poems are edited out so you can listen to them recited individually.
"Allegiance to Life: Staying steady through the mess we're in", An interview with Joanna Macy from ''Tricycle: The Buddhist Review

American Buddhists
Engaged Buddhists
Deep ecologists
Ecofeminists
American environmentalists
American anti–nuclear weapons activists
Activists from the San Francisco Bay Area
Writers from the San Francisco Bay Area
Writers about activism and social change
20th-century American non-fiction writers
21st-century American non-fiction writers
American women non-fiction writers
American women memoirists
Women religious writers
American religious writers
American women poets
20th-century American poets
21st-century American poets
Academics from California
Buddhism in the San Francisco Bay Area
1929 births
Living people